Kohlhiesels Töchter  (English title: Kohlhiesel's Daughters) is a 1920 German silent comedy film directed by Ernst Lubitsch and starring Henny Porten, Emil Jannings and Jakob Tiedtke. It is an adaptation of the play Kohlhiesel's Daughters by Hanns Kräly, Lubitsch's frequent collaborator, who also worked on the film's screenplay. Three further film adaptations have been made of the work including a 1930 sound remake which also starred Porten.

It was shot at the Tempelhof Studios in Berlin

Synopsis
In Bavaria, a sweet-natured young woman Gretel wants to get married but her father refuses to allow the match until her elder sister Liesel has married first. As Liesel is notorious for her bad-tempered personality, this is no easy challenge.

Cast 
Jakob Tiedtke as Mathias Kohlhiesel, Wirt des "Dorfkruges"
Henny Porten as Liesel, the older daughter & Gretel, the younger daughter
Emil Jannings as Peter Xaver
Gustav von Wangenheim as Paul Seppl
Willy Prager as the merchant

References

External links 

 (German title cards and French subtitles)

1920 films
1920 romantic comedy films
German romantic comedy films
Films of the Weimar Republic
Films directed by Ernst Lubitsch
German black-and-white films
Films set in Bavaria
Films set in the Alps
German silent feature films
Films shot at Tempelhof Studios
UFA GmbH films
Silent romantic comedy films
1920s German films
1920s German-language films